Codrington Island is a small uninhabited island off the north-east coast of Antigua.

Location and landscape 
Codrington Island lies on the north-east coast of Atlantic, in the Mercers Creek Bay in about 50 meters from the Antigua shore and approximately 100 meters of the town Rooms Estate, Pelican Island is located directly to north — two islands are connected to the mainland by the reefs. Crump Island is in the north-west. The cove which is detached from the Mercers Creek Bay by Codrington Island and lies to the south of island is called Lords Cove.

Codrington Island is about 400 meters long and maximum 300 meters wide with a bay in the west with a small companion islet there. It rises only a few meters above the sea level, is covered by tropical shrubland and has no beach.

History 
The island derived its name from the Codrington family, who were among the leading planters of the island, in particular they had the Barbuda (Barbuda's capital is also named after the family).

Now the island is owned by the Crown. Since 2006 it is the part of the North East Marine Management Area (NEMMA, 78 km²), rather unspecific reservation.

References 

Uninhabited islands of Antigua and Barbuda